A pie is a baked dish which is usually made of a pastry dough casing that contains a filling of various sweet or savoury ingredients. Sweet pies may be filled with fruit (as in an apple pie), nuts (pecan pie), brown sugar (sugar pie), sweetened vegetables (rhubarb pie), or with thicker fillings based on eggs and dairy (as in custard pie and cream pie). Savoury pies may be filled with meat (as in a steak pie or a Jamaican patty), eggs and cheese (quiche) or a mixture of meat and vegetables (pot pie).

Pies are defined by their crusts. A filled pie (also single-crust or bottom-crust), has pastry lining the baking dish, and the filling is placed on top of the pastry but left open. A top-crust pie has the filling in the bottom of the dish and is covered with a pastry or other covering before baking. A two-crust pie has the filling completely enclosed in the pastry shell. Shortcrust pastry is a typical kind of pastry used for pie crusts, but many things can be used, including baking powder biscuits, mashed potatoes, and crumbs.

Pies can be a variety of sizes, ranging from bite-size to those designed for multiple servings.

Etymology

The first known use of the word 'pie' appears in 1303 in the expense accounts of the Bolton Priory in Yorkshire. But the Oxford English Dictionary is uncertain to its origin and says 'no further related word is known outside English'. A possible origin is that the word 'pie' is connected with a word used in a farming to indicate 'a collection of things made into a heap', for example a heap of potatoes covered with earth. One source of the word "pie" may be the magpie, a "bird known for collecting odds and ends in its nest"; the connection could be that Medieval pies also contained many different animal meats, including chickens, crows, pigeons and rabbits. One 1450 recipe for “grete pyes” that might support the "magpie" etymology contained what Charles Perry called "odds and ends", including: "...beef, beef suet, capons, hens, both mallard and teal ducks, rabbits, woodcocks and large birds such as herons and storks, plus beef marrow, hard-cooked egg yolks, dates, raisins and prunes."

History

Antiquity
Early pies were in the form of flat, round or freeform crusty cakes called galettes consisting of a crust of ground oats, wheat, rye, or barley containing honey inside. These galettes developed into a form of early sweet pastry or desserts, evidence of which can be found on the tomb walls of the Pharaoh Ramesses II, who ruled from 1304 to 1237 BC, located in the Valley of the Kings. Sometime before 2000 BC, a recipe for chicken pie was written on a tablet in Sumer.

Ancient Greeks are believed to have originated pie pastry. In the plays of Aristophanes (5th century BC), there are mentions of sweetmeats including small pastries filled with fruit. Nothing is known of the actual pastry used, but the Greeks certainly recognized the trade of pastry-cook as distinct from that of baker. (When fat is added to a flour-water paste it becomes a pastry.) 

The Romans made a plain pastry of flour, oil, and water to cover meats and fowls which were baked, thus keeping in the juices. The Roman approach of covering "...birds or hams with dough" has been called more of an attempt to prevent the meat from drying out during baking than an actual pie in the modern sense. (The covering was not meant to be eaten; it filled the role of what was later called puff paste.) A richer pastry, intended to be eaten, was used to make small pasties containing eggs or little birds which were among the minor items served at banquets. The first written reference to a Roman pie is for a rye dough that was filled with a mixture of goat's cheese and honey.

The 1st-century Roman cookbook Apicius makes various mentions of recipes which involve a pie case. By 160 BC, Roman statesman Marcus Porcius Cato (234–149 BC), who wrote De Agri Cultura, notes the recipe for the most popular pie/cake called placenta. Also called libum by the Romans, it was more like a modern-day cheesecake on a pastry base, often used as an offering to the gods. With the development of the Roman Empire and its efficient road transport, pie cooking spread throughout Europe. Wealthy Romans combined many types of meats in their pies, including mussels and other seafood. Roman pie makers generally used vegetable oils, such as olive oil, to make their dough.

Pies remained as a staple of traveling and working peoples in the colder northern European countries, with regional variations based on both the locally grown and available meats, as well as the locally farmed cereal crop. In these colder countries, butter and lard were the main fats in use, which meant that pie cooks created dough that could be rolled flat and moulded into different shapes. The Cornish pasty is an adaptation of the pie to a working man's daily food needs. The first reference to "pyes" as food items appeared in England (in a Latin context) as early as the 12th century), but it is not clear that this referred to baked pies.

Medieval era
In the Medieval era, pies were usually savory meat pies made with "...beef, lamb, wild duck, magpie pigeon -- spiced with pepper, currants or dates". Medieval cooks had restricted access to ovens due to their costs of construction and need for abundant supplies of fuel. Since pies could be easily cooked over an open fire, this made pies easier for most cooks to make. At the same time, by partnering with a baker, a cook could focus on preparing the filling. The earliest pie-like recipes refer to coffyns (the word actually used for a basket or box), with straight sealed sides and a top; open-top pies were called traps. The resulting hardened pastry was not necessarily eaten, its function being to contain the filling for cooking, and to store it, though whether servants may have eaten it once their masters had eaten the filling is impossible to prove. The thick crust was so sturdy it had to be cracked open to get to the filling. This may also be the reason why early recipes focus on the filling over the surrounding case, with this development leading to the use of reusable earthenware pie cases which reduced the use of expensive flour. Medieval pie crusts were often baked first, to create a "pot" of baked dough with a removable top crust, hence the name pot pie.

The first unequivocal reference to pie in a written source is in the 14th century (Oxford English Dictionary sb pie). The eating of mince pies during festive periods is a tradition that dates back to the 13th century, as the returning Crusaders brought pie recipes containing "meats, fruits and spices". Some pies contained cooked rabbits, frogs, crows, and pigeons. In 1390, the English cookbook A Forme of Cury had a recipe for “tartes of flesh”, which included a ground-up mixture of "pork, hard-boiled eggs, and cheese" blended with "spices, saffron, and sugar". The 14th century French chef Taillevent instructed bakers to "crenelate" pie shells and "reinforce them so that they can support the meat"; one of his pies was high enough that it resembled a model of a castle, an illusion enhanced by miniature banners for the nobles at the event.

Pies in the 1400s included birds, as song birds at the time were a delicacy and protected by Royal Law. At the coronation of eight-year-old English King Henry VI (1422–1461) in 1429, "Partrich" and "Pecok enhakill" were served, alleged by some modern writers to consist of cooked peacock mounted in its skin on a peacock-filled pie. The expressions "eat crow" and "four and 20 blackbirds" are sayings from the era when crow and blackbirds were eaten in pies.  Cooked birds were frequently placed by European royal cooks on top of a large pie to identify its contents, leading to its later adaptation in pre-Victorian times as a porcelain ornament to release of steam and identify a good pie. The apple pie was first referenced in writing in 1589, when the poet R. Green wrote "Thy breath is like the seeme of apple pies".

Medieval England had an early form of sweet pies called tarts and fruit pies were unsweetened, because sugar was a rare and costly status symbol. In the Middle Ages, a pie could have a number of items as its filling, but a pastry would have only a single filling.

15th to 17th centuries

Until the start of the 15th century, pies were expected to contain meat or fish. In the 15th century, custard and fruit pie recipes began appearing, often with dried fruit like dates and raisins (fresh fruit did not become widely used until sugar dropped in price during the 16th century). The first fruit pie is recorded in the late 16th century, when Queen Elizabeth I was served cherry pie. Queen Elizabeth I was often given gifts of quince or pear pies for New Years. During the Shakespearean era, fruit pies were served hot, but others were served at room temperature, as they would be brought to the "...table more than once". Apple pies were popular in Tudor and Stuart times. Pippins were baked with cloves, cinnamon, dates and candied orange peels. Rosewater was often added to apple pies.

The Elizabethan food author Gervase Markham called for baking “Red Deer Venison, Wild-Boar, Gammons of Bacon, Swans, Elkes, Porpus and such like standing dishes, which must be kept long" in a "...moyst, thick, tough, course and long-lasting crust, and therefore of all other your Rye paste is best for that purpose.” The largest pies of the era were "standing pies", which were baked with steam holes, which were then sealed with melted butter (which would harden to seal the pie), and then eaten over several months.

During the Puritan era of Oliver Cromwell, some sources claim mince pie eating was banned as a frivolous activity for 16 years, so mince pie making and eating became an underground activity; the ban was lifted in 1660, with the Restoration of the monarchy. Food historian Annie Gray suggests that the myth of the Puritans 'actively' banning mince pies came about 'due to the defenders of Christmas' who reported Puritan vitriol 'with a certain amount of exaggeration'. In the 17th century, Ben Jonson described a skilled pie cook by comparing the cook to a fortification builder who "...Makes citadels of curious fowl and fish" and makes "dry-ditches", "bulwark pies" and "ramparts of immortal crusts". In Gervase Markham's 1615 book The English Huswife, there is a pie recipe that calls for "an entire leg of mutton and three pounds of suet..., along with salt, cloves, mace, currants, raisins, prunes, dates, and orange peel", which made a huge pie that could serve a large group.

18th century
In the Georgian era sweetened pies of meat and dried fruits began to become less popular. In recipe books of the period sweet veal, sweet lamb or sweet chicken pies are given alongside recipes for unsweetened alternatives with the same ingredients made for those who could "no longer stomach the sweetened flesh meats enjoyed by earlier generations".

Pumpkin pie was fashionable in England from the 1650s onward, then fell out of favour during the 18th century. Pumpkin was sliced, fried with sweet herbs sweetened with sugar and eggs were added. This was put into a pastry case with currants and apples. Pumpkin pie was introduced to America by early colonists where it became a national dish.

19th century

During the 19th century pies became, according to food historian Janet Clarkson, "universally esteemed" in a way that other foods were not. In 1806 Mrs Rundell in her Observations on Savoury Pies in A New System of Domestic Cookery stated that 'There are few articles of cookery more generally liked than relishing pies, if properly made'. Alexis Soyer, a celebrity cook of the 19th century said in his book Shilling Cookery for the People (1860) "From childhood we eat pies - from girlhood to boyhood we eat pies - in fact, pies in England may be considered as one of our best companions du voyage through life. It is we who leave them behind, not they who leave us; for our children and grandchildren will be as fond of pies as we have been; therefore it is needful that we should learn how to make them, and make them well! Believe me, I am not jesting, but if all the spoilt pies made in London on one single Sunday were to be exhibited in a row beside a railway line, it would take above an hour by special train to pass in review these culinary victims".

United States (17th century-1980s)
The Pilgrim fathers and early settlers brought their pie recipes with them to America, adapting to the ingredients and techniques available to them in the New World. Settlers' recipes were for English-style meat pies. The newcomers used the fruits and berries that they were familiar with from Europe, but also began incorporating North American vegetables and game that they were not familiar with, with guidance from Indigenous people. Settlers favoured pies over bread because pies required less flour and did not require a brick bread oven, and because any mixture of ingredients could be added to pies to "stretch" their "meager provisions". The apple pie made with American apples became popular, because apples were easy to dry and store in barrels over the winter. Early American pies had thick, heavy crusts made with rough flour and suet. As pioneers spread westward, pies continued to be an important supply of food; while apple pies made from dried apples were popular, cooks often had to use fillers or substitutes to stretch out their barrels of apples, such as crushed crackers, vinegar-soaked potatoes, sour green tomatoes and soft-shelled river turtle meat.

The first Thanksgiving feast included fowl and venison, which may have been included in pies. Colonists appreciated the food preservation aspect of crusty-topped pies, which were often seasoned with "dried fruit, cinnamon, pepper and nutmeg". Their first pies included pies that were based on berries and fruits pointed out to them by the Native North Americans. Pies allowed colonial cooks to use round shallow pans to literally "cut corners" and to create a regional variation of shallow pie. By the late 1700s, cookbooks show a wide range of newly developed sweet pies.

Pies became more refined with subsequent waves of immigrants; the Pennsylvania Dutch contributed a more aromatic, spiced, and less-sweet style of pie-making; the French brought the approach of making pie with butter and a range of tart, galette and pâté (forcemeat of meat and fish in dough) recipes. Swedish immigrants in the plains states brought recipes for fish pie and berry pie; Finnish immigrants brought their recipes for pasties and meat pies. In the northern states, pumpkin pie was popular, as pumpkins were plentiful. Once the British had established Caribbean colonies, sugar became less expensive and more widely available, which meant that sweet pies could be readily made. Molasses was popular in American pies due to the rum and slave trade with the Caribbean Islands, although maple syrup was an important sweetener in Northern states, after Indigenous people taught settlers how to tap maple trees and boil down the sap. In the Midwest, cheese and cream pies were popular, due to the availability of big dairy farms. In the US south, African-Americans enjoyed sweet potato pies, due to the widespread availability of this type of potato.

By the 1870s, the new science of nutrition led to criticism of pies, notably by Sarah Tyson Rorer, a cooking teacher and food editor who warned the public about how much energy pies take to digest. Rorer stated that all pie crusts "...are to be condemned" and her cookbook only included an apple tart, jelly and meringue-covered crackers, pâté, and a "hygienic pie" which had "apple slices or a pumpkin custard baked in biscuit dough". In 1866, Harper's Magazine included an article by C.W. Gesner that stated that although we "...cry for pie when we are infants", "Pie kills us finally", as the "heavy crust" cannot be digested.

Another factor that decreased the popularity of pies was industrialization and increasing movement of women into the labour market, which changed pie making from a weekly ritual to an "occasional undertaking" on special occasions. In the 1950s, after WWII, the popularity of pies rebounded in the US, especially with commercial food inventions such as instant pudding mixes, Cool Whip topping, and Jello gelatin (which could be used as fillings) ready-made crusts, which were sold frozen, and alternative crusts made with crushed potato chips. There was a pie renaissance in the 1980s, when old-fashioned pie recipes were rediscovered and a wide range of cross-cultural pies were explored.

Regional variations

Meat pies with fillings such as steak, cheese, steak and kidney, minced beef, or chicken and mushroom are popular in the United Kingdom, Australia, South Africa and New Zealand as take-away snacks. They are also served with chips as an alternative to fish and chips at British chip shops.

Pot pies with a flaky crust and bottom are also a popular American dish, typically with a filling of meat (particularly beef, chicken, or turkey), gravy, and mixed vegetables (potatoes, carrots, and peas).  Frozen pot pies are often sold in individual serving size.

Fruit pies may be served with a scoop of ice cream, a style known in North America as pie à la mode. Many sweet pies are served this way. Apple pie is a traditional choice, though any pie with sweet fillings may be served à la mode. This combination, and possibly the name as well, is thought to have been popularized in the mid-1890s in the United States. Apple pie can be made with a variety of apples; cultivars such as the Golden Delicious, Pink Lady, Granny Smith, and Rome Beauty are popular for usage in pies.

In literature
Cold pigeon pies and venison pasties appear in novels by Jane Austen, but also more generally in writing in the 18th century. The character Mrs Elton, from the 1815 novel Emma, believes herself to be modern, but nevertheless plans to take 'pigeon-pies and cold lamb' to a country outing to Box Hill and consults George Turberville's 1575 work The Noble Art of Venerie (1575) for advice.

In the 1817 novel Persuasion, Jane Austen includes pies in her description of an old-fashioned Christmas spread, mentioning 'tressels and trays, bending under the weight of brawn and cold pies'. In the whole of Persuasion, brawn and cold pies are the only specific mention of food; they are also the only Christmas foods to be mentioned in any of Jane Austen's novels.

In popular culture
In the United States of America, a popular idiom is "American as apple pie". There pie, especially apple pie, became intertwined to the point that in 1902, The New York Times asserted that "pie is the food of the heroic" and "no pie-eating people can ever be permanently vanquished".

The slang expression "to eat humble pie" comes from the umble pie, which was made with chopped animal offal. "It's a piece of pie", meaning that something is easy, dates from 1889. "Pie-eyed", meaning drunk, dates from 1904. The expression "pie in the sky", to refer to an unlikely proposal or idea, comes from "The Preacher and the Slave", a 1911 Joe Hill song.

Pie throwing

Cream filled or topped pies are favorite props for slapstick humor. Throwing a pie in a person's face has been a staple of film comedy since Ben Turpin received one in Mr. Flip in 1909.  More recently, pieing has also become a political act; some activists throw cream pies at politicians and other public figures as a form of protest.

Types

Savory

Aloo pie
Bacon and egg pie
Navy Bean Pie
Butter pie
Calzone
Cheese and onion pie
Chicago style pizza
Chicken and mushroom pie
Corned beef pie
Cottage pie
Curry pie
Game pie
Fish pie
Frito pie
Homity pie
Jamaican patty
Kalakukko
Meat pie
Meat and potato pie
Pasty
Pork pie
Pot pie
Quiche
Rabbit pie
Scotch pie
Shepherd's pie
Stargazy pie
Steak pie
Steak and kidney pie
Steak and kidney pudding
Tourtière

Sweet
Some of these pies are pies in name only, such as the Boston cream pie, which is a cake.  Many fruit and berry pies are very similar, varying only the fruit used in filling. Fillings for sweet or fruity are often mixed, such as strawberry rhubarb pie.

Apple pie
Banoffee pie
Blackberry pie
Black bottom pie
Blueberry pie
Buko pie
Bundevara
Cashew pie
Cherry pie
Chess pie
Chestnut pie
Chiffon pie
Cream pie
Custard pie
Egg pie
Fried pie
Key lime pie
Lemon pie
Lemon meringue pie
Milk pie
Mince pie
Peanut pie
Pecan pie
Pumpkin pie
Rhubarb pie
Saskatoonberry pie
Shoofly pie—a cake-like molasses pie, sometimes crustless
Strawberry pie
Sugar pie
Sweet potato pie
Turtle pie
Walnut pie

See also

 American Pie Council
 Cobbler (food)
 Crostata
 Crumble
 Dabby-Doughs
 Empanada
 Flan
 Galette
 List of baked goods
 List of desserts
 List of pies, tarts and flans
 Pie in American cuisine
 Pirog
 Pirozhki
 Shortcrust pastry
 Strudel
 Tart

References

Further reading 

 Beranbaum, Rose Levy. The Pie and Pastry Bible. New York: Scribner, 1998.
 Clarkson, Janet. Pie - A Global History. London: Reaction Books 2009.
 Heatter, Maida. Maida Heatter's Pies & Tarts. New York. Cader Books: 1997.
 Purdy, Susan S. The Perfect Pie. Broadway Books. New York: 2000.
 Stewart, Martha. Martha Stewart's Pies & Tarts. New York: Clarkson N. Potter, Inc., 1985.
 Walter, Carole. Great Pies & Tarts. New York: Clarkson/Potter Publishers, 1998.
 Willard, Pat. Pie Every Day: Recipes and Slices of Life. Chapel Hill, NC: Algonquin Books of Chapel Hill, 1997.

External links

 
 A Tale of Two Tarts by Monica Gaudio (contains info that can be added into article with references)
 Food Timeline, History Notes: Pie & Pastry
 A Wide Variety of Pie Recipes at recipeforpie.com

 
Types of food